Microgaming is a privately held gambling software company based in the Isle of Man. The company first developed online casino software in 1994.

Overview
In May 2009, Microgaming's progressive slot Mega Moolah paid out $6,374,434, the largest online casino pay-out to date. A new Guinness world record was set on 6 October 2015 when it paid £13,209,300 (equivalent to €17,879,645 at the time) to a British soldier.

References

Online gambling companies of the Isle of Man
Online poker companies
Gambling websites
Gambling companies established in 1994